Keone Joseph Young is an American actor. He is best known for his television roles as Dr. Michael Kwan in Kay O'Brien (1986), Mr. Wu in Deadwood (2004–2006) and as the dual roles of Judge Robert Chong and Mr. Wan in The Young and the Restless (2007–2010). His voice-over roles include Kaz in Hi Hi Puffy AmiYumi and Luong Lao Shi in American Dragon: Jake Long.

Early life
Young was born in Honolulu, Hawaii, to a Chinese father and Japanese mother, who both immigrated to Hawaii. His acting mentor was Mako.

Career
He has been prolific in his character work and has made numerous guest appearances on such varied television series as Head of the Class, Diff'rent Strokes, The Golden Girls, Murphy Brown, Mad About You, Family Matters, Futurama, The Simpsons, Alias, JAG, The Steve Harvey Show, Zeke and Luther, Shake It Up: Made In Japan and on the daytime soaps The Young and the Restless and Generations. He also portrayed the bodyguard of the Ancient One (Keye Luke) during the Asian Quarter storyline on General Hospital.

Young played Dr. Michael Kwan on the short-lived multi-ethnic medical drama Kay O'Brien, which aired in the fall of 1986 on CBS. Despite the fact that the network had high hopes for the series, just 9 of 13 episodes were aired. He was also a semi-regular on the HBO series Deadwood as Mr. Wu and played Henry Lin's Uncle on the FX series Sons of Anarchy. He also played Mr. Wu, unrelated to the Deadwood character, in the film Men in Black 3, and played the role of Ellison Onizuka In the TV film Challenger.

Young has many voice-over credits as well, including Kaz in Hi Hi Puffy AmiYumi and Luong Lao Shi in American Dragon: Jake Long.

Young also has several Star Trek links: he played Buck Bokai, a famous baseball player in the 24th century in the Star Trek: Deep Space Nine episode "If Wishes Were Horses". He also played Hoshi Sato's father in the Star Trek: Enterprise episode "Vanishing Point". Young appeared as Governor Ho in the film North starring Elijah Wood.

In theatre, Young has had a long history with the Asian American theatre company, East West Players, in Los Angeles, where he not only performed but often served as producer.

In 2013, Young joined the cast of HBO's True Blood as Dr. Hido Takahashi, the man responsible for inventing the titular blood substitute.

Filmography

Film

Television

Video games

References

External links

 
 Keone Young on the Internet Off-Broadway Database

Living people
American film actors of Asian descent
American male actors of Chinese descent
American male actors of Japanese descent
American male film actors
American male soap opera actors
American male stage actors
American male television actors
American male video game actors
American male voice actors
Hawaii people of Chinese descent
Hawaii people of Japanese descent
Male actors from Hawaii
Male actors from Honolulu
20th-century American male actors
21st-century American male actors
Year of birth missing (living people)